The 1908 Iowa State Cyclones football team represented Iowa State College of Agricultural and Mechanic Arts (later renamed Iowa State University) in the Missouri Valley Conference during the 1908 college football season. In their second season under head coach Clyde Williams, the Cyclones compiled a 6–3 record (2–1 against conference opponents), tied for second place in the conference, shut out five of nine opponents, and outscored all opponents by a combined total of 186 to 50. E. W. Law was the team captain.

Between 1892 and 1913, the football team played on a field that later became the site of the university's Parks Library. The field was known as State Field; when the new field opened in 1914, it became known as "New State Field".

Schedule

References

Iowa State
Iowa State Cyclones football seasons
Iowa State Cyclones football